The Union Bank of California Building is a 27-storey,  skyscraper in San Diego, California, completed in 1969. For 20 years, the tower stood as the tallest building in the city, until the completion of the  Symphony Towers in 1989.

See also
List of tallest buildings in San Diego

References

Office buildings completed in 1969
Skyscraper office buildings in San Diego
International style architecture in California